Me and Morrison is a 2001 Finnish romantic drama film directed by Lenka Hellstedt. The film is based on the novel Minä ja Morrison by Katariina Souri and is the second film in the Restless trilogy, preceded by Restless (2000) and followed by Addiction (2004).

Cast
 Irina Björklund as Milla
 Samuli Edelmann as Aki
 Roope Karisto as Joonas
 Eva Röse as Sophie
 Titta Jokinen as Milla's mother
 Yorick van Wageningen as Jan
 Baltasar Kormákur as Askildsen
 Irina Pulkka as a travel agency clerk
 Maija-Liisa Márton as Kerttu, Aki's mother

Reception
Gunnar Rehlin of Variety praised Irina Bjorklund for her "knockout performance", saying that "[this] is enough [of a reason] to see this Finnish drama about two loners who find each other but realize it's difficult to stop the spiral from continuing downward".

Awards
Jussi Awards

|-
| rowspan=2|2002||rowspan=2|Me and Morrison||Best Actress (Paras naispääosa)||
|-
|Best Editing (Paras leikkaus)Best Film (Paras elokuva)||
|}

References

External links
 

Films based on Finnish novels
2001 romantic drama films
Films shot in Finland
Films set in Finland
Films scored by Tuomas Kantelinen
Finnish romantic drama films
2000s Finnish-language films